The 2010 Prague municipal election was held as part of 2010 Czech municipal elections. It was held on 15 and 16 October 2010. Prague was divided into 7 electoral districts with 9 mandates allocated for each district. It created a "natural threshold."

Election was won by TOP 09 ahead of Civic Democratic Party. Czech Social Democratic Party came third. Civic Democrats then formed coalition with Social Democrats and Bohuslav Svoboda became Mayor of Prague.

Opinion polling

Results

References

2010
Prague municipal election
Municipal election, 2010